Requiebro is a 1955 Argentine film directed by Carlos Schlieper, starring Carmen Sevilla and Ángel Magaña.

Cast
Carmen Sevilla	
Ángel Magaña 	
Ricardo Castro Ríos 			
Luis Dávila 	
Manuel Perales 	 		
Irma Roy 			
Amalia Sánchez Ariño

References

External links
 

1955 films
1950s Spanish-language films
Argentine black-and-white films
Films directed by Carlos Schlieper
1955 musical comedy films
Argentine musical comedy films
1950s Argentine films